Halbblut was a 1919 silent film directed by Fritz Lang: "A story of two men and one woman, in four acts."  It is the first film Lang directed. It stars Carl de Vogt, Ressel Orla, Gilda Langer, Carl Gebhard-Schröder, Paul Morgan and Edward Eysenek. It is presumed to be lost.

See also 
List of films made in Weimar Germany
List of lost films

References

External links
 
 Halbblut at SilentEra

1919 films
Lost drama films
Films of the Weimar Republic
German silent feature films
Films directed by Fritz Lang
German black-and-white films
Lost German films
German historical drama films
1910s historical drama films
Films produced by Erich Pommer
Films with screenplays by Fritz Lang
1919 lost films
1919 directorial debut films
1919 drama films
Silent drama films
1910s German films